Beautiful is a 2008 South Korean film, and the debut feature of director Juhn Jai-hong. The film is based on an original story by Kim Ki-duk.

Plot 
Eun-Yeong is a young woman who finds her beauty to be a curse, drawing unwanted attention from all kinds of men and making other women jealous. Nevertheless, she leads a relatively content life until she is raped by one of her stalkers, Seong-min, who then blames Eun-Yeong for the incident, saying, "I did it because you're so beautiful". Traumatized by her attack, Eun-Yeong tries to destroy her beauty, first by attempting to become obese, and when that fails by making herself unattractively thin. When her beauty does start to fade, she becomes alarmed and tries to regain it by wearing gaudy makeup and revealing clothes, her behavior increasingly destructive and unstable. A policeman, Eun-Cheol, watches her downfall with pity and sympathy, but eventually, he too submits to his lustful desires.

Cast 
 Cha Soo-yeon ... Eun-yeong
 Lee Chun-hee ... Eun-cheol
 Choi Moo-sung ... Detective Kim
 Kim Min-soo ... Seong-min
 Lee Min ... Mi-yeon
 Bae Yong-geun ... Beauty salon boss
 Kim Seon-bin ... Working man
 Jo Seok-hyeon ... Lavatory man
 Lee Chang-min ... Police station man

Release 
Beautiful premiered in the Panorama section of the 58th Berlin International Film Festival, and was given a limited theatrical release in South Korea on February 14, 2008, where it was screened in just five Seoul theaters. As of March 31, 2008, it had received a total of 1,478 admissions, and as of April 13, it grossed .

Awards 
Beautiful won the Grand Prix at the 2008 Fukuoka Asian Film Festival.

References

External links 
  
 
 
 

2008 films
2008 drama films
South Korean independent films
South Korean drama films
Sponge Entertainment films
2000s Korean-language films
2008 directorial debut films
2008 independent films
2000s South Korean films